Sarah Elizabeth Richmond (1843–1921) was a teacher and the fourth principal of Maryland State Normal School (now Towson University).

She was the second person to enroll at the Maryland State Normal School in its opening year and was in its first graduating class. Her 55 years of consecutive service to the Normal School began in 1866, when McFadden Newell asked her to return there to teach mathematics. Within a few years, Richmond was made Vice Principal and, by 1909, at age 66, she became the school's first female principal. She remained principal until 1917 when she resigned to become Dean of the school. In addition to being the driving force in moving the school to its current Towson location, Richmond raised entrance requirements, expanded the curriculum and created new departments.

She died in 1921.

External links
 Presidential Biographies - Towson Archives

Presidents of Towson University
1843 births
1921 deaths